Otermanjärvi is a medium-sized lake in Vaala municipality, in Finland. It belongs to the Oulujoki main catchment area.

See also
List of lakes in Finland

References

External links
 

Oulujoki basin
Lakes of Vaala